1419 Danzig is a highly elongated Flora asteroid from the inner regions of the asteroid belt. It was discovered on 5 September 1929, by German astronomer Karl Reinmuth at Heidelberg Observatory in southwest Germany. It was named for the city of Gdańsk.

Classification and orbit 

When applying the synthetic hierarchical clustering method (HCM) by Nesvorný, Danzig is a member of the Flora family, a giant asteroid family and the largest family of stony asteroids in the main-belt. However, according to the 1995 HCM-analysis by Zappalà, and HCM-analysis by Milani and Knežević (AstDys), it is a background asteroid. The latter HCM-analysis does not recognize the Flora asteroid clan.

Danzig orbits the Sun at a distance of 2.0–2.6 AU once every 3 years and 6 months (1,268 days). Its orbit has an eccentricity of 0.15 and an inclination of 6° with respect to the ecliptic.

Naming 

This minor planet was named after the now Polish city and port on the Baltic sea, Gdańsk. The city was also honored by another minor planet, . Naming citation was first mentioned in The Names of the Minor Planets by Paul Herget in 1955

Physical characteristics 

The overall spectral type for Florian asteroid is that of a stony S-type.

Rotation period and pole 

In November 1988, Polish astronomer Wiesław Wiśniewski obtained a rotational lightcurve of Danzig from photometric observations. It gave a well-defined rotation period of  hours with a brightness variation of 0.92 magnitude. In October 2002, another lightcurve obtained by Italian and French amateur astronomers Silvano Casulli and Laurent Bernasconi gave a concurring period of  hours and an amplitude of 0.81 magnitude. While Danzig has an average rotation period, it has a high brightness variation, which indicates that the body has a non-spheroidal shape. In 2011, a modeled lightcurve using data from the Uppsala Asteroid Photometric Catalogue (UAPC) and other sources gave a period  hours, as well as a spin axis of (22.0°, 76.0°) in ecliptic coordinates (λ, β).

Diameter and albedo 

According to the surveys carried out by the Japanese Akari satellite, and NASA's Wide-field Infrared Survey Explorer with its subsequent NEOWISE mission, Danzig measures 14.059 and 15.09 kilometers in diameter and its surface has an albedo between 0.238 and 0.260. The Collaborative Asteroid Lightcurve Link adopts Petr Pravec's revised WISE-data, that is, an albedo of 0.2324 and a diameter of 14.139 kilometers with an absolute magnitude of 11.45.

References

External links 
 Lightcurve Database Query (LCDB), at www.minorplanet.info
 Dictionary of Minor Planet Names, Google books
 Asteroids and comets rotation curves, CdR – Geneva Observatory, Raoul Behrend
 Discovery Circumstances: Numbered Minor Planets (1)-(5000) – Minor Planet Center
 
 

001419
Discoveries by Karl Wilhelm Reinmuth
Named minor planets
19290905